Star Wars: The High Republic: The Fallen Star is a novel written by Claudia Gray and is the final adult novel in the Star Wars: The High Republic franchise's first phase, Light of the Jedi. It is a direct sequel to Light of the Jedi and The Rising Storm taking place 200 years before Star Wars: The Phantom Menace. It follows the continued conflict between the Jedi Order and the Nihil.

Premise
The Jedi deal with the aftermath of tragedy and a widespread attack on the Republic Fair, dubbed the "conflagrine on the flames" by the "space Vikings" known as the Nihil. As Knights and Padawans stationed on Starlight Beacon recuperate from injuries and emotional trauma, Marchion Ro prepares his deadliest attack on the Order.

Marketing
The novel's title was revealed at San Diego Comic-Con in July 2021 along with three other novels in the third wave of Light of the Jedi. The tagline associated with the third wave was "The Light of the Jedi goes dark", hinting at the increasingly grim direction the novel is set to take the franchise towards.

References

External links
 

2021 American novels
2021 science fiction novels
Novels based on Star Wars